Thomas Teye Partey (born 13 June 1993) is a Ghanaian professional footballer who plays as a midfielder for  club Arsenal and the Ghana national team.

Partey began his professional career at Spanish club Atlético Madrid in 2013, going on loan to Mallorca and Almería, and returned to Atlético in 2015, with whom he won the UEFA Europa League and UEFA Super Cup in 2018. In 2020, he joined Arsenal in a transfer worth £45 million (€50 million), becoming the most expensive Ghanaian player of all time.

A Ghanaian international, Partey represented his nation at three Africa Cup of Nations (2017, 2019, and 2021) and the 2022 FIFA World Cup. He was named into the CAF Team of the Year in 2018, and won Ghana Player of the Year in 2018 and 2019.

Club career

Atlético Madrid

Born in Krobo Odumase, Partey was a product of local club Odometah's youth ranks. He signed with Atlético Madrid in 2012, after a short spell with Leganés, and was subsequently moved to the reserves a year later. On 10 March 2013, Partey was called up to the main squad for the match against Real Sociedad. However, he remained unused in the eventual 0–1 home defeat.

Mallorca and Almería
On 12 July, Partey was loaned to Mallorca, freshly relegated to the second level. On 18 August, he made his professional debut, in a 0–4 away defeat against Sabadell. Partey scored his first professional goal on 15 September, netting his side's second of a 2–2 draw at Hércules.

On 27 July 2014, Partey joined La Liga side Almería on a loan. He made his debut in the competition on 23 August, starting in a 1–1 home draw against Espanyol. Partey scored his first goals in the main category of Spanish football on 11 April 2015, netting a brace in a 3–0 home win against Granada.

Return to Atlético Madrid
Partey made his first team debut for Atlético Madrid on 28 November 2015, replacing Luciano Vietto in a 1–0 home win against Espanyol. On 2 January of the following year, he scored his first league goal for the club, netting the game's only strike in a home success over Levante. On 28 May, he played in the UEFA Champions League Final against Real Madrid, replacing Koke in the 116th minute as his side lost on penalties.

Partey signed a contract extension with Atlético Madrid through 2022 on 14 February 2017. On 31 October, he scored his first European goal with a long-range strike to equalise at home to Qarabağ in a 1–1 draw in the Champions League group game; he became the first African to score in the competition for Atlético. Following his impressive performances for the club, he was rewarded with another contract on 1 March 2018, this time until 2023. On 16 May, he played in the 2018 UEFA Europa League Final, as his side won 3–0 against Marseille.

On 1 September 2019, Partey came on as a late substitute and netted the match's winner in the last minute of the game, as Atlético came back from 2–0 down to win the game by 3–2 against Eibar. He marked his 100th La Liga appearance for Los Rojiblancos with a man-of-the-match performance in a 0–0 draw against Real Madrid in the Madrid derby four weeks later. Despite leaving Atlético at the beginning of the 2020–21 season, Partey made enough appearances at the start of the season to become eligible for a winner's medal as Atlético won La Liga that year.

Arsenal
 
On 5 October 2020, Premier League club Arsenal announced the signing of Partey on a long-term contract, after activating his £45 million (€50 million) release clause with Atlético Madrid. He was given the number 18 shirt, which had been vacated by Nacho Monreal the previous season. Upon signing, Partey stated his desire to help Arsenal "back where [they] belong", describing his decision to move being based on "[wanting] to experience new challenges", while also crediting the transfer to manager Mikel Arteta and technical director Edu.

On 17 October 2020, Partey made his debut for Arsenal as a substitute for Granit Xhaka in a 0–1 away defeat in the league against Manchester City. Five days later, he started his first match for Arsenal in a 2–1 away win over Rapid Wien in the UEFA Europa League. Midway through a match against Aston Villa on 8 November, he suffered a thigh injury which saw him miss the rest of the month's games. He returned on 6 December in the North London derby, but suffered another injury at half-time as Arsenal lost 2–0 to Tottenham Hotspur. He did not play again until a month later, which he came off the bench in a 0–0 draw against Crystal Palace. On 22 October 2021, Partey scored his first goal for Arsenal in a 3–1 win against Aston Villa. In February 2022, Partey was named Arsenal's player of the month.

International career
In May 2016, Partey was called up for the first time to the Ghana national team by manager Avram Grant, ahead of a 2017 Africa Cup of Nations qualification match against Mauritius. He made his debut on 5 June, replacing Frank Acheampong for the final 11 minutes of a 2–0 away win that booked the Black Stars' position in the finals. On 5 September 2017, Partey scored his first international hat-trick in a 5–1 win against Congo in 2018 FIFA World Cup qualification.

Partey was chosen in Kwesi Appiah's 23-man squad for the 2019 Africa Cup of Nations in Egypt. In their last group game, he scored in a 2–0 win over Guinea-Bissau at the Suez Stadium as the Black Stars topped their group. He netted in the penalty shootout at the end of the last-16 game against Tunisia on 8 July, though his team was eliminated.

Partey won Ghana Player of the Year in 2018 and 2019. Ahead of the 2021 Africa Cup of Nations qualifiers, as well as for the 2022 FIFA World Cup qualifiers, Partey was named Ghana's vice-captain. 

In November 2022, Partey was called up to the 26-man Ghana squad that would compete in Qatar for the 2022 FIFA World Cup.

Media
Partey was involved in the Amazon Original sports docuseries All or Nothing: Arsenal, which documented the club by spending time with the coaching staff and players behind the scenes both on and off the field throughout their 2021–22 season.

Personal life
In March 2022, because of his Moroccan girlfriend, Sara Bella, Partey converted to Islam. In June, it was reported that he had changed his first name to Yakubu as part of his religious conversion, while remaining Thomas Partey both legally and professionally; he said days later that he had changed his name back to Thomas.

In June 2022, Partey was made a chief of the Manya Krobo people of the Eastern Region of Ghana by their leader Sakite II, as a reward for captaining the team to 2022 FIFA World Cup qualification at the expense of neighbours Nigeria.

Career statistics

Club

International

Ghana score listed first, score column indicates score after each Partey goal.

Honours
Atlético Madrid
La Liga: 2020–21
UEFA Europa League: 2017–18
UEFA Super Cup: 2018
UEFA Champions League runner-up: 2015–16

Individual
CAF Team of the Year: 2018
SWAG Sports Personality of the Year: 2018
Ghana Player of the Year: 2017, 2018
Ghana Football Awards Foreign-based Player of the Year: 2017–18, 2018–19
Ghana Football Awards Footballer of the Year: 2017–18, 2018–19

References

External links

Profile at the Arsenal F.C. website
Profile at the Premier League website

1993 births
Living people
People from Eastern Region (Ghana)
Ghanaian footballers
Association football midfielders
Atlético Madrid B players
RCD Mallorca players
UD Almería players
Atlético Madrid footballers
Arsenal F.C. players
Segunda División B players
Segunda División players
La Liga players
Premier League players
Ghana international footballers
2017 Africa Cup of Nations players
2019 Africa Cup of Nations players
2021 Africa Cup of Nations players
2022 FIFA World Cup players
Ghanaian expatriate footballers
Expatriate footballers in Spain
Expatriate footballers in England
Ghanaian expatriate sportspeople in Spain
Ghanaian expatriate sportspeople in England
Ghanaian Muslims
Converts to Islam